Skidmore-Tynan High School is a public high school situated in Skidmore, Texas (USA) and classified as a 3A school by the UIL. It is part of the Skidmore-Tynan Independent School District located in southern Bee County. In 2013, the school was rated "Met Standard" by the Texas Education Agency.

Departments

Math/Science
The school has business application and general computer labs. The school recently upgraded the machines in an attempt to ensure the students have the best equipment available in the technology field. They also have access to several school-owned laptop computers capable of wireless hi-speed internet connections in math and science classrooms. The math and science departments also have various data-gathering probes and devices allowing laboratory work in use with computer and calculator technology, where students can see the applications of various concepts in real-time.

Occupational/Vocational
STHS has an occupational department, offering business education and preparation, work-study programs, and agricultural/vocational programs. Classes in horticulture, welding, livestock care, criminal justice, as well as computer applications, programming, and image management and multimedia are part of the variety of career courses S-T offers. The campus has a Future Farmers of America chapter, and recently started a Future Business Leaders of America chapter, in conjunction with a campus computer club.

Athletics
The Skidmore-Tynan Bobcats compete in the following sports 

Baseball
Basketball
Cross Country
Football
Golf
Powerlifting
Softball
Tennis
Track and Field
Volleyball

S-T also participates in powerlifting through the Texas High School Powerlifting Association. The Bobcats reached Regional semifinals in 2005, their third time to go to playoffs in the last four years. They also advanced from district to regional in cross country, where they sent a competitor to the UIL State Cross Country meet.  The athletic department is sponsored by the S-T Athletic Booster Club. Skidmore-Tynan has recently hired a new A.D. (Athletic Director), John Livas

Visual and Performing Arts
The High School also includes a fine arts department. S-T has classes for both marching and concert band. The concert band earned a Division I in UIL Concert Competition in 2013, and another Division I in UIL Marching Competition in 2012. The band is active in the community, and plays at various local functions, as well as community centers and nursing homes. In 2005, the One Act Play cast and crew advanced to Region IV competition in UIL with the play "Chaim's Love Song". In 2006, the OAP cast and crew advanced to Area with "The Crocodile Smile." In 2014, the One Act Play cast and crew advanced to Region with scenes from "Laughing Stock", and were alternates to Area in 2015 with scenes from "The Musical Comedy Murders of 1940", with several young actors and actresses receiving individual awards. The visual arts department sent a competitor to the Visual Arts Scholastic Event(VASE) State Meet in 2005. The art department has won many awards at area and regional art competitions and shows. They are also responsible for campus beautification, as they took their skills to the plain buildings and structures and campus, and decked them in purple and gold school colors. Recently the ST Band received a 1 rating meaning they were a superior band at the UIL region Marching Contest in Sinton, TX. This was the first in history for the band to get a 1 in marching, and the first time in STISD history that the band  advanced to the area marching contest.
The band also received in Spring 2010 straight division 1's in both concert and sight reading, earning them the first Sweepstakes award in history for the school district. And in 2011, the band received yet another 1 for marching.

Academics
STHS is home to a UIL Speech and Academics team, which sent seven competitors to Regional competition in 2005. The school also hosts chapters of the National Honor Society and International Thespian Society. The high school was a state-exemplary campus in 2002 and recognized in 2003.

STHS is also one of many high schools in the area that offers dual-credit classes in conjunction with Coastal Bend College.

References

External links
Skidmore-Tynan ISD

Schools in Bee County, Texas
Public high schools in Texas